The Utuado uprising, also known as the Utuado revolt or El Grito de Utuado, refers to the revolt against the United States government in Puerto Rico which occurred on October 30, 1950, in the town of Utuado. There were simultaneous revolts in various other towns in Puerto Rico, including the capital of San Juan and the cities of Mayaguez and Arecibo, plus major confrontations in the city of Ponce and the towns of Peñuelas and Jayuya.

Events leading to the revolt
On September 17, 1922, the Puerto Rican Nationalist Party was formed. José Coll y Cuchí, a former member of the Union Party, was elected its first president. He wanted radical changes within the economy and social welfare programs of Puerto Rico.  In 1924, Pedro Albizu Campos, a lawyer, joined the party and was named its vice president.

Albizu Campos was the first Puerto Rican graduate of Harvard Law School. He served as a Second Lieutenant in the U.S. Army during World War I, and believed that Puerto Rico should be an independent nation - even if that required an armed confrontation. By 1930, Coll y Cuchi departed from the party because of his disagreements with Albizu Campos as to how the party should be run. On May 11, 1930, Albizu Campos was elected president of the Nationalist Party.

In the 1930s, the U.S.-appointed governor of Puerto Rico, Blanton Winship, and police colonel Riggs applied harsh repressive measures against the Nationalist Party. In 1936, Albizu Campos and the leaders of the party were arrested and jailed at the La Princesa prison in San Juan, and later sent to the Federal Prison at Atlanta.

On March 21, 1937, the Nationalists held a parade in Ponce and the police opened fire on the crowd, in what was to become known as the Ponce massacre. 19 people were killed, including two police officers and 17 unarmed Puerto Ricans - including a 7-year-old girl, who was shot in the back. Although the police shot the 18 people, Albizu Campos was arrested, and sentenced to ten years in a U.S. federal prison. Campos finally returned to Puerto Rico on December 15, 1947, after completing his ten-year sentence.

On May 21, 1948, a bill was introduced before the Puerto Rican Senate which would restrain the rights of the independence and Nationalist movements on the island. The Senate, controlled by the Partido Popular Democrático (PPD) and presided by Luis Muñoz Marín, approved the bill that day. This bill, which resembled the anti-communist Smith Act passed in the United States in 1940, became known as the Ley de la Mordaza (Gag Law) when the U.S.-appointed governor of Puerto Rico, Jesús T. Piñero, signed it into law on June 10, 1948.

Under this new law it would be a crime to print, publish, sell, or exhibit any material intended to paralyze or destroy the insular government; or to organize any society, group or assembly of people with a similar destructive intent. It made it illegal to sing a patriotic song, and reinforced the 1898 law that had made it illegal to display the Flag of Puerto Rico, with anyone found guilty of disobeying the law in any way being subject to a sentence of up to ten years imprisonment, a fine of up to US$10,000, or both.

According to Dr. Leopoldo Figueroa, member of the Partido Estadista Puertorriqueño (Puerto Rican Statehood Party) and the only member of the Puerto Rico House of Representatives who did not belong to the PPD, the law was repressive and in violation of the First Amendment of the US Constitution which guarantees Freedom of Speech.

On June 21, 1948, Albizu Campos gave a speech in the town of Manatí, which explained how this Gag Law violated the First Amendment of the U.S. Constitution. Nationalists from all over the island had gathered - to hear Campos's speech, and to prevent the police from arresting him.

Uprisings

From 1949 to 1950, the Nationalists began to prepare for an armed revolution.  The revolution was to take place in 1952, on the date the United States Congress was to approve the creation of the political status of Free Associated State (Estado Libre Associado) for Puerto Rico.

Albizu Campos called for an armed revolution because he considered the "new political status" a colonial farce. Campos picked the town of Jayuya as the headquarters of the revolution because of its location, and weapons were stored in the home of Blanca Canales.

On October 26, 1950, Albizu Campos was holding a meeting in Fajardo when he received word that his house in San Juan was surrounded by police waiting to arrest him.  He was also told that the police had already arrested other Nationalist leaders.  He escaped from Fajardo and ordered the revolution to start.

On October 27, in the town of Peñuelas, the police surrounded and fired on a caravan of Nationalists, killing four. On October 30, the Nationalists staged uprisings in the towns of Ponce, Mayagüez, Naranjito, Arecibo, Utuado (Utuado Uprising), San Juan (San Juan Nationalist revolt), and Jayuya.

The first incident of the Nationalist uprisings occurred in the pre-dawn hours of October 29. The Insular Police surrounded the house of the mother of Melitón Muñiz Santos, the president of the Peñuelas Nationalist Party in the barrio Macaná, under the pretext that he was storing weapons for the Nationalist revolt. Without warning, the police fired on the house and a gunfight ensued. Two Nationalists were killed and six police officers were wounded. Nationalists Meliton Muñoz Santos, Roberto Jaume Rodriguez, Estanislao Lugo Santiago, Marcelino Turell, William Gutirrez and Marcelino Berrios were arrested and accused of participating in an ambush against the local Insular Police.''

US response

The United States declared martial law in Puerto Rico and sent the Puerto Rico National Guard, commanded by the Puerto Rico Adjutant General  Major General Luis R. Esteves and under the orders of Gov. Luis Muñoz Marín, to attack the various towns involved in the Nationalist uprisings. In the case of Jayuya, the town was attacked by air by U.S. bomber planes. The U.S. Air Force used 500-pound bombs and 50-calibre machine guns, leaving Jayuya in ruins, and proceeded to bomb the neighboring town of Utuado, demolishing approximately 70% of the town. In Utuado, 4 Nationalists were killed as were 3 members of the US-backed forces, including 2 National Guardsmen and one police officer.

The Nationalist leaders in Utuado were the Captain of the Utuado branch of the Cadets of the Republic Heriberto Castro and Damián Torres. According to the plans of Albizu Campos, the Nationalists were to put up an armed resistance in their respective towns and then retreat to Utuado. Once in Utuado, the Nationalists were to continue fighting against the Armed Forces of the United States, until the United Nations Security Council took notice and intervened in their favor.

United States law mandated that U.S. President Harry Truman take direct charge in all matters concerning Puerto Rico. In addition, the Governor of Puerto Rico, Luis Muñoz Marín was required to consult directly with the White House. But this did not occur.

Aftermath

The top leaders of the Nationalist party were arrested, including Albizu Campos and the leader of the Jayuya Uprising, Blanca Canales. All of them were imprisoned, and served long jail terms.

On November 1, 1950, Nationalists Griselio Torresola and Oscar Collazo attacked the Blair House with the intention of assassinating U.S. President Truman. Torresola and White House police officer Leslie Coffelt died in the failed attempt. Collazo was arrested and sentenced to death. His sentence was later commuted to life imprisonment by President Truman, and he eventually received a presidential pardon.

The last major attempt by the Puerto Rican Nationalist Party to draw world attention to Puerto Rico's colonial situation occurred on March 1, 1954. On that day, Nationalist leader Lolita Lebrón and fellow Nationalists Rafael Cancel Miranda, Irvin Flores and Andres Figueroa Cordero attacked the United States House of Representatives. Lebrón and her comrades were charged with attempted murder and other crimes. Gilberto Martínez, one of the last survivors of the Utuado Uprising, died on January 1, 2009.

Incarcerated Nationalists
The following is an FBI list of the Utuado Nationalists who were incarcerated in 1950 and who were still in prison as of 1954:
Jose Aviles Maisonet
Angel Luis Colon Feliciano
Gilberto Martinez Negron
Jose Angel Medina Gigueroa
Juanita Ojeda Maldonado
Elidio Olivera Albarran
Octavio Ramos Rosario

See also

Elías Beauchamp
Ducoudray Holstein Expedition
Grito de Lares
Intentona de Yauco
Río Piedras massacre
List of Puerto Ricans

References

Further reading
"War Against All Puerto Ricans: Revolution and Terror in America’s Colony"; Author: Nelson Antonio Denis; Publisher: Nation Books (April 7, 2015); ; .

1950 in Puerto Rico
1950 protests
Conflicts in 1950
October 1950 events in North America
Political history of Puerto Rico
Rebellions against the United States
Utuado, Puerto Rico